Gaudichaudia is a genus of crabs in the family Xanthidae, containing the following species:

 Gaudichaudia gaudichaudii (H. Milne-Edwards, 1834)
 Gaudichaudia tridentatus (Lenz, 1902)

References

Xanthoidea
Decapod genera